Lovelace is a surname and a given name. Notable people with the name include:

Surname
Ada Lovelace (1815–1852), English mathematician
Alan M. Lovelace (born 1929), American bureaucrat
Amanda Lovelace (born 1991), American poet
Avril Lovelace-Johnson, Ghanaian jurist
Carey Lovelace, American journalist
Carl Lovelace (1878–1941), American politician
Che Lovelace (born 1969), Trinidadian artist
Claud Lovelace (1934–2012), English physicist
Creighton Lovelace (born 1981), American pastor
Dede Lovelace, American skateboarder
Delos W. Lovelace (1894–1967), American author
Earl Lovelace (born 1935), Trinidadian writer
Eldridge Lovelace (1913–2008), American urban planner
Francis Lovelace (1621–1675), English politician
George Lovelace (1936–2020), American army officer and politician
James J. Lovelace (born 1948), American general
John Lovelace, 2nd Baron Lovelace (1616–1670), English peer
John Lovelace, 3rd Baron Lovelace (1641–1693), English politician
John Lovelace, 4th Baron Lovelace (1672–1709), English politician
Jonathan Bell Lovelace (1895–1979), American businessman
Josh Lovelace, American musician
Kawan Lovelace (born 1976), Belizean athlete
Kelley Lovelace, American musician
Kenny Lovelace (born 1936), American musician
Kimara Lovelace, American musician
Linda Lovelace (1949–2002), American pornstar
Mary Lovelace O'Neal (born 1942), American artist
Maud Hart Lovelace (1892–1980), American writer
Richard Lovelace, 1st Baron Lovelace (1564–1634), English politician
Richard Lovelace (1618–1657), English poet
Richard V. E. Lovelace, American astrophysicist
Sandra Lovelace Nicholas (born 1948), Canadian indigenous activist and senator
Stacey Lovelace-Tolbert (born 1974), American basketball player
Tom Lovelace (1897–1979), American baseball player
Vance Lovelace (born 1963), American baseball player
William Lovelace (died 1577), English politician
William Randolph Lovelace II (1907–1965), American physician

Given name
Lovelace Ackah (born 1976), Ghanaian footballer
Lovelace Stamer (1829–1908), English bishop
Lovelace Watkins (1938–1995), American singer
Henderson Lovelace Lanham (1888–1957), American politician
Mary Lovelace Schapiro (born 1955), American bureaucrat
Sandra Lovelace Nicholas (born 1948), Canadian politician and activist
Sharon Lovelace Blackburn (born 1950), American judge
William Lovelace Walton (1788–1865), British army officer